Zvyagino is a rural locality (a hamlet) in Chulkovsky Selsoviet, Vachsky District, Nizhny Novgorod Oblast, Russia.

References 

Rural localities in Nizhny Novgorod Oblast